The Gyeongbuk Line (慶北線, Keihoku-sen) was a railway line of the privately owned Chōsen Railway (Chōtetsu) in colonial-era Korea, located in North Gyeongsang Province, connecting Gimcheon (on the Chōsen Government Railway's Gyeongbu Line main line) with Gyeongbuk Andong.

History
Construction of the line was begun by the privately owned Chosen Industrial Railway; however, before the line was finished, that company merged with five others to create the Chosen Railway (Chōtetsu) in 1923, and it was the new company which completed the first section of the line, opening the Gimcheon–Sangju section on 1 October 1924,  followed by the Sangju–Jeomchon section on 25 December. Chōtetsu then extended the line in several stages, first reaching Yecheon on 1 November 1928, then reaching Gyeongbuk Andong on 16 October 1931; however, the Jeomchon–Andong section was dismantled in 1944 to use the material elsewhere as Japan's military faced material shortages during the Pacific War. 

After the Liberation of Korea, Chōtetsu was nationalised along with all other railways in the country. The Gyeonbuk Line was subsequently operated by the Korean National Railroad, retaining the name Gyeongbuk Line but extending it to Yeongju instead of rebuilding it to Andong.

Services
In the November 1942 timetable, the last issued prior to the start of the Pacific War, Chōtetsu operated the following schedule of third-class-only local passenger services:

Route

References

Rail transport in South Korea
Rail transport in Korea
Korea under Japanese rule
Defunct railway companies of Japan
Defunct railway companies of Korea
Chosen Railway